Kekela-o-kalani or Kekela was a common female name among members of the Hawaiian royal family:

 Kekelaokalani I of Hawaii, daughter of King Keaweʻīkekahialiʻiokamoku and Queen Kalanikauleleiaiwi
 Kekelaokalani-a-Kauakahiakua, daughter of Kauakahiakua and Kekuiapoiwa I
 Fanny Kekelaokalani, mother of Queen Emma of Hawaii
 Wilhelmine Kekelaokalaninui Widemann Dowsett, 20th-century Hawaiian women suffragist